The Good Life is an album by saxophonist Willis Jackson which was recorded in 1963 and released on the Prestige label.

Reception

Allmusic awarded the album 2½ stars stating "IIt's pleasing, if unsurprising, early-'60s organ soul-jazz with a good balance between brass, organ, and guitar, perhaps more useful as club groove music than home listening".

Track listing 
 "The Good Life" (Sacha Distel, Jack Reardon) – 5:06  
 "Days of Wine and Roses" (Henry Mancini, Johnny Mercer) – 4:05  
 "As Long as She Needs Me" (Lionel Bart) – 3:44  
 "Fly Me to the Moon" (Bart Howard) – 2:57  
 "Angel Eyes" (Earl Brent, Matt Dennis) – 4:16  
 "Troubled Times" (Willis Jackson, Wade Marcus, William "Mickey" Stevenson) – 4:54  
 "Walk Right In" (Gus Cannon, Hosea Woods) – 6:05  
Recorded at Van Gelder Studio in Englewood Cliffs, New Jersey on May 23 (tracks 1-5), & May 24 (tracks 6 & 7), 1963

Personnel 
Willis Jackson – tenor saxophone
Frank Robinson – trumpet
Carl Wilson – organ
Pat Martino – guitar
Leonard Gaskin – bass (tracks 6 & 7)
Joe Hadrick  – drums

References 

Willis Jackson (saxophonist) albums
1963 albums
Prestige Records albums
Albums recorded at Van Gelder Studio
Albums produced by Ozzie Cadena